Sisters of St. Dominic Motherhouse Complex, is a historic convent complex and national historic district at 555 Albany Avenue in North Amityville, Suffolk County, New York.

The complex consists of five contributing buildings, a cemetery, and grotto.  Rosary Hall (formerly the novitiate for the sisters whose original motherhouse was at Graham and Montrose Avenues in Williamsburg, Brooklyn) is the largest building in the complex and has four sections.

It was built 1876–1878 and in a Gothic Revival style brick quadrangle composed of three 2½-story sections and a 1½-story section. Rosary Hall includes the chapel, which has a tall steeple.  At the center of the quadrangle is the Cloister Garden.  The remaining building is Seraphina Cottage, the original novitiate.  It was built about 1850 and is a 1½-story vernacular Greek Revival farmhouse.

St. Dominic Motherhouse Complex was added to the National Register of Historic Places in 2007.

References

External links
Dominican Sisters of Amityville, New York
Dominican Village

Roman Catholic churches in New York (state)
Properties of religious function on the National Register of Historic Places in New York (state)
Gothic Revival architecture in New York (state)
Roman Catholic churches completed in 1878
Historic districts in Suffolk County, New York
National Register of Historic Places in Babylon (town), New York
Historic districts on the National Register of Historic Places in New York (state)
19th-century Roman Catholic church buildings in the United States